Johann Rasso Januarius Zick (6 February 1730 – 14 November 1797) was a German painter and architect. He is considered to be one of the main masters of the Late-Baroque.

Life
Januarius Zick was born in Munich and began to learn his trade from his father, Johannes Zick, a renowned painter himself, to whom he was apprenticed in order to learn how to paint frescoes. In 1744, when Januarius Zick was fourteen years old, his brother, three years his junior, fell to his death from a scaffolding in Weingarten. From 1745 to 1748, Januarius Zick was apprenticed as a bricklayer to Jakob Emele in Schussenried. Having finished his apprenticeship, he worked, together with his father, at the residence of the Prince-Bishop of Würzburg and then, until the mid-1750s, at the residence of the Prince-Bishop of Speyer in Bruchsal.

In 1756, Januarius Zick went to Paris for further education. There, he came into contact with artists and art connoisseurs from Rome, Basel and Augsburg, who broadened his horizon concerning his art and had a considerable influence on him. 

After having furnished Castle Engers near Neuwied with frescoes in 1760, he was appointed court painter to the Prince-Elector of Trier, the archbishop of Trier. He married in Ehrenbreitstein and settled there. 

After 1774, he also designed intarsia paintings for cabinet maker David Roentgen. 

From the late 1770s on, Januarius Zick was very active in Upper Swabia, furnishing a number of monastery churches and parish churches with frescoes and altarpieces. 

After the mid-1780s until his death, he was productive in the territories of the Prince-Elector of Trier and the Prince-Elector of Mainz.

He died in Ehrenbreitstein.

Works
 1760 - Castle Engers, frescoes
 1778 until 1781 - Benedictine church, Wiblingen Abbey, painter and interior designer
 1780 - Parish church Zell (Riedlingen)
 1782 - Parish church Dürrenwaldstetten
 1782/83 - Benedictine monastery church Oberelchingen near Ulm
 1784 - Premonstratensian monastery church Rot an der Rot Abbey
 1785 - Residence of the Prince-Elector of Trier in Koblenz, fresco painter
 1786 - Church St Ignatius and office of cathedral provost in Mainz
 1786 - Augustinian monastery church Triefenstein
 1787 - Prince-Elector's Castle in Mainz
 1790 - Court church in Koblenz, altarpiece
 1792 and 1793 - Representative buildings in Frankfurt am Main, Palace Schweitzer and Russischer Hof

See also

 Upper Swabian Baroque Route
 Zick

Further reading 
 
 
 
 
 
 
 
 

18th-century German architects
1730 births
1797 deaths
Court painters
18th-century German painters
18th-century German male artists
German male painters
Rococo architects
Architects from Munich
Architects of Roman Catholic churches
Catholic painters